Christian Hug (born 24 March 1982 in Heidelberg, West Germany) is a German international rugby union player, playing for the SC Neuenheim in the Rugby-Bundesliga and the German national rugby union team.

Biography
Hug played for Germany on a number of occasions and his last international was a friendly against Switzerland in 2007.

On domestic level, he won two German championships with his club team in 2003 and 2004 against DRC Hannover and made losing appearances in the 2001 finals against DRC Hannover and again in 2006 against RG Heidelberg.

Honours

National team
 European Nations Cup - Division 2
 Champions: 2008

Club
 German rugby union championship
 Winner: 2003, 2004
 Runners up: 2001, 2006
 German rugby union cup
 Winner: 2001
 Runners up: 2002

Stats
Christian Hug's personal statistics in club and international rugby:

National team

European Nations Cup

Friendlies & other competitions

 As of 15 December 2010

Club

 As of 30 April 2012

References

External links
 Christian Hug profile at totalrugby.de

1982 births
Living people
Rugby union locks
German rugby union players
Germany international rugby union players
SC Neuenheim players
Sportspeople from Heidelberg